The swimming events of the 2001 World Aquatics Championships were held in a temporary pool at Marine Messe in Fukuoka, Japan in July 2001. This edition of the championships featured 20 events for both men and women, including the introduction of a 50 m event in all strokes and equality in the distance freestyle events, with both men and women swimming both 800 and 1500 m.

The swimming event resulted in eight world records and Australia topping the medal tally with 13 golds, although the USA claimed 26 total medals to 19 for Australia. The men's FINA Trophy (top individual performers) was awarded to Australia's Ian Thorpe for his three individual wins and three world records. Inge de Bruijn (the Netherlands) won the women's FINA Trophy for three individual wins. Australia swept the men's relays and won two of three of the women's relays, although were subsequently disqualified in the women's 4×200 m freestyle for a post-race infraction – jumping into the pool before all teams had finished.

The Seiko timing system used for the swimming events at the championships experienced some faults with the touch pads throughout the eight days of competition causing controversy amongst teams and media.

Medal table

Medal summary

Men

Legend: WR – World record; CR – Championship record

Women

Legend: WR – World record; CR – Championship record

See also
List of world records in swimming
List of World Championships records in swimming

References

 FINA Official Championship Results History – Swimming (men)
 FINA Official Championship Results History – Swimming (women)

 
2001 World Aquatics Championships
World Aquatics Championships
Swimming at the World Aquatics Championships